Paddy is a diminutive form of the male given names Patrick, Patricia, Padraig, Padraic and variant forms. It is also a nickname.

Notable people include:
Paddy Ashdown (1941–2018), British politician and diplomat
Paddy Barnes (born 1987), Irish amateur boxer
Paddy Baumann (1885–1969), American baseball player
Paddy Belton (1926–87), Irish politician
Paddy Bradley (born 1981), Irish Gaelic footballer
Paddy Buckley (1925–2008), Scottish footballer
Paddy Chayefsky (1923–81), American playwright, screenwriter and novelist
Paddy Clancy (1922–98), Irish folk singer
Paddy Considine (born 1973), English actor, filmmaker, screenwriter and musician
Paddy Corrigan (born 1962), Irish retired hurling player
Paddy Cullen, Irish former football goalkeeper and manager
Paddy Daly (1888–1957), member of the Irish Republican Army and major-general in the Irish National Army
Paddy Doherty (disambiguation), several people
Paddy Donegan (1923–2000), Irish politician
Paddy Driscoll (1896–1968), American football quarterback in both the Pro and College Football Halls of Fame
Paddy Finucane (1920–1942), Second World War flying ace with the Royal Air Force
Paddy Fisher (born 1998), American football player
Paddy George, New Zealand rugby union and rugby league footballer who played in the 1900s and 1910s
Paddy Glackin (born 1954), Irish fiddler
Paddy Golden (born 1972), Northern Irish emergency physician and sports doctor
Paddy Gormley (1916–2001), Irish politician
Charles Patrick Green (1914–1999), South African-born British Royal Air Force Second World War fighter ace
Paddy Greene (1875–1934), American baseball player
Paddy Greene (hurler) (1916–1997), Irish hurler
Paddy Harrington (1933–2005), Irish Gaelic footballer
Paddy Harte (1931–2018), Irish politician
Paddy Hayes (born 1965), Irish Gaelic footballer
Paddy Henderson (disambiguation), multiple people
Paddy Keenan (born 1950), Irish player of the uilleann pipes
Paddy Kennedy (disambiguation), various people
Paddy Kenny (born 1978), Premier League football goalkeeper
Paddy Larkin, Irish hurling player of the 1930s and 1940s
Paddy Livingston (1880–1977), American baseball player
Paddy Lowe (born 1962), British motor racing engineer
Paddy Mayne (1915–55), British Army lieutenant colonel and founder of the elite Special Air Service, solicitor and Irish rugby union international
Paddy Mayes (1885–1963), American baseball player
Paddy McAloon (born 1957), English singer, songwriter and member of the band Prefab Sprout
Paddy McCarthy (born 1983), Irish footballer
Paddy McCourt (born 1983), Footballer from Northern Ireland
Paddy McGuinness (born 1973), English sit-down comedian, actor, television personality and presenter
Paddy McNair (born 1995), Footballer from Northern Ireland
Paddy Mendis (born 1933), 4th Commander of the Sri Lanka Air Force
Paddy Mitchell (1942–2007), Canadian bank robber
Paddy Moloney (born 1938), founder and leader of the Irish musical group The Chieftains
Paddy Moore (1909–51), Irish footballer
Paddy Mullins (1919–2010), Irish racehorse trainer
Paddy O'Brien (disambiguation), several people
Paddy O'Connor (1879–1950), Irish-American baseball player
Paddy O'Kane, Irish footballer during the 1920s and 1930s
Paddy O'Keeffe (1864–?), Irish hurler
Paddy O'Reilly (born 1959), Australian writer
Paddy Quinn (disambiguation), multiple people
Paddy Reilly (disambiguation), various people
Paddy Ryan (1851–1900), Irish American boxer and world heavyweight champion (1880–1882)
J.P. "Paddy" Saul (1895–1968), Irish aviator and seaman
Paddy Siglin (1891–1956), American baseball player
Paddy Smith (disambiguation), multiple people
Paddy Tuimavave, former professional rugby league footballer who represented New Zealand and Western Samoa
Paddy Wallace (born 1979), Irish rugby union footballer

See also
Patti (name), given name and surname
Patty (given name)

Unisex given names
Hypocorisms
Lists of people by nickname
English unisex given names
English masculine given names
English feminine given names